Four More Respected Gentlemen is an unreleased album by the English rock band the Kinks. The project arose out of the band's different American contract schedule, which obligated them to submit a new LP to Reprise Records in June1968. As the band continued recording their next album, released later in the year as The Kinks Are the Village Green Preservation Society, bandleader Ray Davies submitted fifteen completed master tapes to Reprise. The label planned to issue the LP in the US in November1968 but abandoned the project only a month beforehand for unclear reasons.

Reprise initially expected to include twelve tracks on Four More Respected Gentlemen, but later resequenced it to have eleven. The eleven tracks were mostly recorded between late1967 and June1968 and are generally fast rock songs. Davies later stated that he intended the album to satirise English social etiquette, though commentators dispute his characterisation. Following Reprise's abandonment of the album, its songs were spread across several subsequent releases, including Village Green and the US compilation albums The Kink Kronikles (1972) and The Great Lost Kinks Album (1973). Work on the LP did not proceed beyond the white-label test-pressing stage. As of 2000, only two test pressings are known to exist.

Background 
In September1967, English rock band the Kinks issued their fifth UK studio album Something Else by the Kinks. Following the album's release, the band began stockpiling numerous recordings for later use without initially knowing when or in what format they would be released. Bandleader Ray Davies initially thought about making a solo LP, but as recording sessions persisted into June1968, his idea evolved into plans for the Kinks' next studio album. At that time, the band's UK label, Pye Records, expected to issue their next album during that year's Christmas season. The new project was initially given the working title Village Green before being re-titled The Kinks Are the Village Green Preservation Society in August1968.

During the 1960s, differences in the royalty structures of the American and British markets meant US labels typically resequenced albums to have fewer tracks than their British counterparts. The Kinks had unique contract schedules for each country which required them to release albums at different times and tailored for each market. By June1968, as sessions for Village Green continued, the band were contractually obligated to immediately submit a finished LP to their US label, Reprise Records.

History

June1968: Initial plans 

In the first week of June1968, Davies selected fifteen finished recordings to send to Reprise to fulfill the Kinks' contractual obligation. After learning from the Kinks' management that the band expected to have another album ready by September, Reprise opted to not issue an album immediately but instead scheduled a November1968 release.

Rather than include all fifteen tracks, Reprise planned to have twelve songs on the album. The project was given the working title Four More Respected Gentlemen, a reference to the band's 1965 US hit single "A Well Respected Man", and a photograph of the band taken by official BBC photographer Harry Goodwin was slated for the album cover.

October1968: Test pressings and cancellation 

After Reprise made their initial plans for the album in late June1968, they took no further action until October1968. At that time, they reduced its planned track listing to eleven songs, began making label-copy sheets for the LP's first pressing and produced several white-label test pressings for technical analysis. Planning continued for the album's cover artwork and the LP was assigned a serial number.

Reprise halted work on the album suddenly the same month, a situation which resulted in confusion for the band's fans. Adding to the confusion, the Schwann Long Playing Record Catalog listed the album in error for several months as part of the Kinks' released discography.

Reprise's reasons for cancelling the album are unclear. Band biographers offer competing explanations; John Mendelsohn suggests Davies stopped the album himself out of an apprehension which stemmed from the poor performance of the band's recent singles. Peter Doggett writes the label cancelled the album after Davies decided to expand Village Green from twelve to fifteen songs, and Davies himself later suggested that rather than issue two albums in the US, he wanted to include as many tracks as possible on Village Green. Doug Hinman thinks label executives instigated the cancellation after being promised about the quality of Village Green, while Johnny Rogan simply writes it was stopped while Reprise waited for Village Green UK release. The label did not receive Village Green master tapes until 20 December 1968 but made no plans to restart the release of Four More Respected Gentlemen.

Content 

The fifteen songs Davies sent to Reprise range chronologically from "Autumn Almanac" to "Days", recorded in September1967 and May–June 1968, respectively, except for "She's Got Everything", which dates to February1966. Other than "She's Got Everything", the earliest recording on Reprise's eleven-track edition of Four More Respected Gentlemen may have been "Mr. Songbird", recorded around November1967, though "Monica" and "Phenomenal Cat" could date to any time between late1967 and May1968. All of the songs were recorded in the basement studios at Pye Records's London offices. Davies produced all of its tracks, except for "She's Got Everything"; though Shel Talmy produced the song, Reprise credited it to Davies when they issued it as the B-side to "Days". Pye's in-house engineer Brian Humphries likely remixed several of the mono-only tracks for stereo without Davies's involvement.

Four More Respected Gentlemen generally includes fast rock numbers, something band biographer Andy Miller thinks Reprise sought to emphasise when editing the album down to eleven tracks. In an interview with NME, Davies stated that he intended the album satirise English social etiquette, table manners and other outdated customs. Rogan counters that in spite of Davies's comment, none of the eleven tracks planned for the album actually satirise etiquette, something he thinks points to either an abandonment of the original concept or mismanagement of the project by the record label. Miller writes that despite the track listing's quick and seemingly random assembly, Davies's songwriting thematically reflects his increasing unease over his personal and professional lives; many of the songs deal with methods of escape, whether by running away ("Polly"), drinking alcohol ("Misty Water"), listening to music ("Mr. Songbird"), being nostalgic ("Picture Book"), having one-night stands ("Berkeley Mews") or by committing suicide ("Did You See His Name").

Following the album's cancellation, Reprise released all of its tracks on Village Green or one of two US-only compilation albums: The Kink Kronikles (1972) and The Great Lost Kinks Album (1973). Reprise began assembling an early version of the latter compilation in 1969 or 1970, at which time they planned to title it Four More Respected Gentlemen. The eventual title The Great Lost Kinks Album references Gentlemen, though Hinman describes it as misleading since there are only two songs in common between the albums.

Track listing 

All songs by Ray Davies, except where noted.

Ray Davies's original submission 

"She's Got Everything"
"Monica"
"Mr. Songbird"
"Johnny Thunder"
"Polly"
"Days"
"Animal Farm"
"Berkeley Mews"
"Picture Book"
"Phenomenal Cat"
"Misty Water"
"Did You See His Name"
"Autumn Almanac"
"Susannah's Still Alive" (Dave Davies)
"There Is No Life Without Love" (D. Davies)

Reprise's planned track listing 
Side one
"She's Got Everything"
"Monica"
"Mr. Songbird"
"Johnny Thunder"
"Polly"
"Days"

Side two
"Animal Farm"
"Berkeley Mews"
"Picture Book"
"Phenomenal Cat"
"Misty Water"

Notes
After Reprise received Davies's fifteen tracks in June1968, they planned to remove "Did You See His Name", "Animal Farm" and "Picture Book" to make it a twelve-song LP. When the label began making test pressings in October1968, they instead removed "Did You See His Name", "Autumn Almanac", "Susannah's Still Alive" and "There Is No Life Without Love".
Above listings per Doug Hinman and Andy Miller. Divisions of side one and two are per author Doug Crawford.

Notes

References

Citations

Sources 

 
 
 
 
 
 
 
 
 
 
 
 
 
 
 
 
 

The Kinks albums
Unreleased albums
Reprise Records albums
Albums produced by Ray Davies